Beyonders: A World Without Heroes is a 2011 fantasy novel written by American author Brandon Mull. It is the first in the Beyonders trilogy.

Setting
The novel is set in the parallel universe of Lyrian, a world distinct from all others (with every other referred to as "the Beyond"). This uniqueness stems from the fact that it was intentionally created by an unnamed, extremely powerful "Creator". This ambiguous figure created Lyrian using the language he invented, Edomic. Edomic, when spoken and "felt" properly, enables the user to manipulate the matter and energy of Lyrian in a variety of ways, but only in Lyrian. However, to use Edomic in this way requires great natural talent and many years of practice, leading "magic users" to be extremely rare. All living things resist magic, and to use magic you need energy. Humans came to inhabit Lyrian by accidentally transporting themselves there through gateways on Earth. In this way, every human on Lyrian is at some point descended from a "Beyonder". Because people have crossed over from Earth to Lyrian many times throughout history, Elizabethan English happens to have become the dominant language. The technology level is about that of Earth's Middle Ages, supplemented by Edomic and other elements of magic. Roads are both few and primitive, with nature dominating the majority of the landscape. A ruthless wizard (extremely powerful Edomic user), Maldor, has slowly but surely conquered almost all of Lyrian, oppressing the people to an extreme degree.

Plot Summary 
 
Beyonders follows the exploits of a slightly neglected, thirteen-year-old boy, Jason Walker.

Jason leads a relatively normal life until one day at the zoo, when he notices strange music coming from the mouth of a hippo. While leaning over the hippo tank's guard rail, he falls in. The hippo swallows him, but instead of being digested, he's transported to a different world called Lyrian.

After wandering a short way, he learns that the group of musicians playing the music that he heard are called the Giddy Nine and that they plan to ride a raft over a nearby waterfall. In an attempt to save them, he talks to the rescue squad present and asks them why they are not rescuing the band. The archer states that they are just there so that if someone decides to turn back they can help. Before the raft reaches the end of the waterfall, Jason pushes the little man with one arm into the river and grabs the archer's bow with an arrow attached to a rescue line. He aims to shoot the line onto the boat in order to give the band something to grab onto, but instead, his shot goes awry and the arrow pierces the shoulder of one of the musicians. One musician is able to jump to shore before the line is cut by the archer but the rest plummet off the edge of the waterfall. The archer had helped the little man out the river so the archer and the little man who was part of the rescue squad pursue Jason for interfering, so Jason runs off into the woods.

After this, Jason aimlessly wanders into the Repository of Learning, where he's informed by the Librarian/Loremaster that it's an extremely difficult place to reach. The Loremaster offers Jason food, shelter, and virtually unlimited access to the Repository's enormous wealth of books– except the forbidden second story– as a reward for completing the journey. Jason accepts the offer, figuring that there would be no better place for him to discover a way home than one of such vast knowledge.

Finding the books on the first floor to be of little use, he lets curiosity overwhelm him. After discovering the method by which to open the extremely complex lock (almost a puzzle) guarding the second floor, Jason ventures inside at night. He finds the place (as well as the books inside) to be eerie and sinister. After wandering about for a bit, he stumbles across a large text entitled, The Book of Salzared. The book is bound in living human skin, from a displacer. Upon opening it, Jason discovers a strong warning stating that anyone who reads further will place themselves in peril. He reads on, valuing the potential to discover a way home over the risk involved. After reading a short section describing the first syllable of a mysterious word to defeat Maldor, the evil wizard ruler of Lyrian, he closes the book, when a seemingly human eye opens out of the cover. Terrified, Jason panics, dropping the book and his candle and making a racket. Stumbling in the dark, he's found by the loremaster's dog, who leads him to the loremaster. The loremaster then informs Jason that he's sealed his own fate, and must leave immediately in search of someone called the Blind King. After being given directions to the Blind King as well as some food, Jason leaves the Repository of Learning.

After arriving at the Blind King's decrepit keep, Jason learns that the "Blind King" is really Galloran, a broken hero who already tried and failed on the same quest that Jason is now committed to. A few moments after learning of Galloran's true identity, Jason is introduced to Rachel, a girl his age from 'the Beyond", who arrived in Lyrian by walking through a stone arch. Galloran then tells them that they are crucial to a prophecy spoken by a powerful seer, one in which they will destroy the tyrannical wizard emperor, Maldor. Galloran points out that the easiest (though still extremely difficult) way to accomplish this is to seek the Word, a powerful spell that will destroy Maldor when spoken in his presence. The first syllable of the Word has already been discovered by Jason at the repository of learning ('a'). Each syllable of The Word is protected by a guardian, each of whom will only reveal their syllable to those embarked on the quest to destroy Maldor. However, some syllables have also been written down (such as the one at the repository of learning), removing the necessity of directly seeking out the guardians of those syllables. They may only speak or write The Word in its entirety once, after which the individual that did so will forget it. Since Jason was the only one to read the book containing this information, Rachel may opt out. However, she decides to join him. Satisfied with their decision, Galloran presents Jason with a dagger whose blade shoots out of the handle at the pressing of a button on the pommel, while Rachel is given an Orantium sphere, a type of grenade with an explosive crystal encased in glass that explodes when exposed to air or water. He also names Jason as the lord of a previously fallen estate. After being given a starting point by Galloran, Jason and Rachel embark on a quest for the Word. 

Jason and Rachel go down a cliff to reach the first guardian in a submerged cave. Jason goes into the cave, and Rachel follows. They then learn the fourth syllable of the word and that it has six syllables, and that they should visit a disgraced lord named Nicholas Dangler in Trensicourt for further clues to the locations of the syllables. The pair manage to avoid the giant crab guarding the exit, and it kills an enchanted hound that was pursuing them for Maldor. 

On the way to Trensicourt, Jason and Rachel encounter the lone survivor of the Giddy Nine, a man named Tark. Jason manages to talk Tark out of his survivor's guilt, and convinces him to join the rebellion against Maldor. They also meet a Ferrin, a displacer capable of separating and reattaching his limbs. Ferrin joins Jason and Rachel on their journey, and helps them both when they are attacked by the rescuers from the Giddy Nine, who have been conscripted by the emperor's men. One of the rescuers is killed by Ferrin, and the trio is arrested by the constable. Jason, Rachel, and Ferrin escape and travel to Trensicourt, where Ferrin is forced to separate from Jason and Rachel due to his previous execution inside the city.

Jason and Rachel meet with Nicholas Dangler, and learn that the third syllable is hidden within a chamber in the castle. The only way to access this chamber is by beating the Trensicourt Chancellor at a battle of wits. Nicholas had been disgraced for challenging and losing to the chancellor. Jason uses his status as lord to challenge the Chancellor, and miraculously manages to beat him and learn the third syllable in the process.

That night, Jason is attacked and almost killed by an assassin in the night, but manages to escape. The ruler of Trensicourt also shows Jason that he has received an invitation to Harthenham, a paradisaical castle where Maldor invites his enemies in exchange for their allegiance.

Jason, under the pretense of leaving for Harthenham, meets with Ferrin and Rachel and travels to the location of the fifth syllable, an island in the center of a strange lake called Whitelake. The water in Whitelake does not allow boats to float, however it hardens when put under pressure. Rachel manages to run to the island in the center of the lake before collapsing of exhaustion. Afterwards, she finds a cave and meets a displacer named Malar, who has been reduced to a severed head and arm only. Rachel learns the next syllable and Malar also reveals that Ferrin is most likely working for Maldor. After returning to shore, Ferrin simply confirms this is true and he parts ways peacefully from Rachel and Jason.

Rachel and Jason head to the location of the sixth syllable, a prophet living in the swampy Sunken Lands. On the way, they are attacked by Maldor's men, but are saved by a man named Jasher. Jasher is one of the Amar Kabal, capable of resurrecting if their "seed" is planted again. In the Sunken Lands, they meet the prophet's daughter, Corinne, who is unable to leave her home in the Sunken Lands due to special puffballs that cause memory loss. The group successfully collect the sixth syllable, and also learn that Galloran had hidden the second syllable as a tattoo on the body of a man named Kimp, who works for Maldor. Jasher reveals that Kimp lives within Harthenham, and decide to use Jason's invitation to get inside.

Jason infiltrates Harthenham and finds Tark inside, having received an invitation after killing men working for Maldor. Jason manages to identify the final piece of the Word, and he and Tark hatch a plan to escape. Jason is challenged to a duel with the host, and he chooses billiard balls as a weapon, easily winning thanks to his pitching skills from Earth. They are joined in their escape by men named Tristan and Drake. Drake is a seedling like Jasher, but on his final life. The four leave but are attacked by Kimp and a pack of dogs. Tristan, Jasher, and Kimp are killed in the ensuing battle, and Jason is captured.

Drake rescues Jason and the two continue to Felrook, where Maldor lives. Jason gains an audience with him and uses the Word, however, it is revealed that Maldor actually masterminded the Word himself to distract those who wished to harm him. Jason is imprisoned and tortured.

Jason is rescued by Ferrin, who takes him to a portal back to Earth and sends him through. Jason resists, and ends up pulling Ferrin's severed hand along with him. Jason lands back on Earth, on an unknown farm, and swears to find a way back to Lyrian to save his friends.

Theme
The main theme of Beyonders: A World Without Heroes can be broadly interpreted as stressing the importance of moral responsibility and personal sacrifice in service of a greater cause. Lesser themes are Jason's coming of age, as well as his realization that the individual must sometimes accept unwanted responsibilities for the good of all. The presentation of Jason as a character focused on personal honour and resistance to temptation are in line with the symbolism of his being the last "true" hero of Lyrian.

See also
High fantasy
Dark Fantasy
Sword and Sorcery

References
http://www.goodreads.com/book/show/8306745-a-world-without-heroes.html
https://web.archive.org/web/20160304031210/http://bookdads.com/book-review-beyonders/.html
http://beyonders.weebly.com/characters.html
 http://beyonders.weebly.com/summary.html
 http://beyonders.weebly.com/themes.html

2011 American novels
American young adult novels
American fantasy novels
Novels by Brandon Mull
Novels about parallel universes
Aladdin Paperbacks books